Alaf Laila is an Indian television series based on the One Thousand and One Nights, also known as the Arabian Nights. It was produced by Sagar Arts. It was made in two seasons. The series from 1993 to 1997 for 143 episodes on DD National.

The plotline of the series starts from the very beginning when Shahrzad starts telling stories to Shahryar and contains both the well-known and the lesser-known stories from the One Thousand and One Nights which are mentioned here. The name Alif Laila is a short form of the original Arabic title of the One Thousand and One Nights - Alif Layla wa-Layla.

Stories

Season 1 (1993 - 1995)

Ep 1-2 Prologue to the story of King Shahryar and Queen Shahrzad
Ep 2-6 The Trader and the Genie (Taajir aur Jinn)
Ep 6-9 Story of the First Traveller (Pahla Musaafir aur Do Kutton ki Kahaani)
Ep 9-13 Story of the Second Traveller (Doosra Musaafir aur Bakri ki Kahaani)
Ep 13-15 The Fisherman and the Genie (Maahigir aur Jinn)
Ep 15-18 Tale of the Vizier and the Sage Duban (Hakeem Dobaan ki Kahaani)

Ep 19-33 Aladdin and the Magic Lamp (Aladeen aur Jaadui Chiraagh)
Ep 34-47 Ali Baba and the Forty Thieves (Ali Baba aur Chaalis Chor)
Ep 48-49 Sinbad the Sailor and Pirate Qehermann (Sindbad Jahaazi aur Samudri Daaku Keharmann)
Ep 50-55 Sinbad's First Voyage
Ep 56-69 Sinbad's Second Voyage
Ep 70-89 Sindbad's Third Voyage
Ep 90-106 Sindbad's Fourth Voyage
Ep 107-135 Prince Jalal Talib and Malika Hamira (a.k.a. Prince Jalal Talib and the Three Pearls), (Shahzaada Jalaal Taalib aur Malika Hameera)
Ep 136-143 Prince Jamal Saqib and Princess Mahapara (Shahzaada Jamaal Saaqib aur Shahzaadi Mahapaara)

Season 2 (1995 - 1997)
 The Night-Adventures of Caliph Harun al-Rashid (Khaleefa Haarun Rasheed ke Gashte)
 The Caliph's Judgement 
 Story of the Blind Man (Andhe Faqeer Jamaal ki Kahaani)
 Zishan and Sofonisba (Zishaan aur Sofonisba), loosely based on the History of Sidi Nu'uman 
 History of Khwajah Hasan al-Habbal (Khwaaja Hasan Khabaal ki Kahaani)
 Two Brothers Jalal and Bilal (Do Bhaai Jalaal aur Bilaal)
 Prince Afat and Firoza vs Firoz
 (Epilogue to the story of Shahryar and Shahrzad)

Cast

Main 
Girija Shankar as King Shahryar
 Damini Kanwal Shetty (Seema Kanwal) as Queen Shahrzad
 Firoz Ali as Shehzada Afaque

Recurring 
 Shahnawaz Pradhan as Royal Vizier (Prologue), Sinbad the Sailor, clone Badrous (Sinbad arc), thief Asfandyaar (Ali Baba arc)
 Pramod Kapoor as merchant Sirajuddin Shareef Zardaari (Trader & goat arc), prince Gulfaam/Shah Khurram of Mehrabaad/sorcerer Misri (Sinbad arc), sorcerer Azgar (Jalal Taalib arc), King Baazik (Two Brothers arc)
 Mulraj Razda as Hakim Douban
 Neela Patel as fisherman's wife (Fisherman & Genie arc), Aladdin's mother (Aladdin arc), Shah of Baghdad's consort (Sinbad arc), Queen Zamaani of Shahristaan (Jalal Talib arc)
 Papiya Sengupta as princess Gulafsha of Naglistaan
 Sanjeev Sharma as Haasim (Ali Baba arc), Daniel (Jalal Talib arc)
 Pinky Parikh as Duraksha (Trader & goat arc), Fairy Zeba Zeemi Shaheen (Aladdin arc), Marjina (Ali Baba arc), princess Badroulbadour and witch-queen Taaguti (Sinbad arc)
 Sulakshana Khatri as witch Asbela (Sinbad arc), princess of corpses Asjaar Salatiya (Jalal Talib arc)
 Radha Yadav as Dilshad (Ali Baba arc), mother of kidnapped child (Sinbad arc)
 Lata Haya (née Lata Nagar) as Queen Malika-e-Aliyah (Sinbad arc), witch-queen Hameera (Jalal Talib arc)
 Mukul Nag as prince Jamal Saakib of ShahHarounabad (Two Brothers arc)

Home media
The episodes of Alif Laila were released on both VCD and DVD format from Moserbaer. The DVD release was marketed as 20 volumes consisting of 143 episodes.

Broadcast
The show was syndicated in Bengali on BTV, Gazi Television. 
The show has re-aired on channels owned by Shri Adhikari Brothers since its original run. It re-aired from June 2011 on Dabangg TV from 2012 to 2013 and on Dhamaal TV from 2013 to 2016. In 2020 it was broadcast during the quarantine period on DD Bharati.

References

External links
Sagar Pictures website
Production website
Dhamaal TV page

DD National original programming
Indian anthology television series
1993 Indian television series debuts
Indian fantasy television series
Works based on One Thousand and One Nights
Television shows based on fairy tales
Works based on Aladdin
1997 Indian television series endings
Genies in television
Works based on Sinbad the Sailor
Works based on Ali Baba
Jinn in popular culture
Arabian mythology in popular culture
Television series about Islam
Islam in popular culture
Islam in fiction